The 24th César Awards ceremony, presented by the Académie des Arts et Techniques du Cinéma, honoured the best French films of 1998 and took place on 6 March 1999 at the Théâtre des Champs-Élysées in Paris. The ceremony was chaired by Isabelle Huppert and hosted by Antoine de Caunes. The Dreamlife of Angels won the award for Best Film.

Winners and nominees

See also
 71st Academy Awards
 52nd British Academy Film Awards
 11th European Film Awards
 4th Lumières Awards

External links

 Official website
 
 24th César Awards at AlloCiné

1999
1999 film awards
1999 in French cinema